Tristram Shapeero is a British television director.  He has directed many comedy series, initially in the United Kingdom and later in the United States.

Early life
Shapeero was born in Somerset and spent his childhood in Bath, where he attended St. Stephen's School and Beechen Cliff School.

Career
Shapeero started his career as a show runner on Channel 4's Norbert Smith: A Life and then worked on Whose Line Is It Anyway?. He went to New York in 1991 to direct a few television comedy episodes; while in New York he met his future wife, Erica. After moving back to the UK, he continued to direct television comedy., directing British comedies that include all episodes of Pulling, every other episode of Green Wing, and Series 2 and 3 of Peep Show. He also directed episodes of shows such as Brass Eye, I'm Alan Partridge, and Absolutely Fabulous. He has been nominated for a BAFTA eight times – Gimme Gimme Gimme and Brass Eye Special (two nominations) in 2002, Bremner, Bird and Fortune in 2003, Green Wing in 2005 and 2007, Peep Show in 2006, and Pulling in 2007.

Shapeero relocated to Los Angeles in 2009 to direct American television. He first directed an episode of Parks and Recreation, and later was a producer of Community for two seasons and directed 24 episodes of the show. He has also directed Veep, Brooklyn Nine-Nine, and Unbreakable Kimmy Schmidt. Additionally, he directed episodes of short lived series that included “I Feel Bad”, “Trophy Wife”, “The Grinder”, “Benched” and “Pivoting”. 

Shapeero's first feature film as director was A Merry Friggin' Christmas, starring Robin Williams and Joel McHale, and was released in 2014. The film was released by Phase 4 Films on November 7  and received generally negative reviews from critics. On Rotten Tomatoes, the film has a rating of 14%, based on 21 reviews, with an average rating of 3.45/10. On Metacritic, the film has a score of 28 out of 100, based on reviews from 11 critics, indicating "generally unfavorable reviews".

In November 2020 Shapeero forgot to mute his microphone before an online audition on Zoom and was heard making potentially disparaging comments about actor Lukas Gage's apartment, in which he referred to the actor as "poor", saying "These poor people live in these tiny apartments". He later apologised, explaining that his remarks were about how the actor deserved sympathy, as opposed to his economic situation.

Personal life 

Shapeero received an honorary Doctor of Letters from Bath Spa University in 2010.

He is married to his wife, Erica.

Directing credits 

Los Dos Bros (1999–2001)
Smack the Pony (2000)
Gimme Gimme Gimme (2001)
Brass Eye Special (2001)
I'm Alan Partridge (2001)
Bremner, Bird And Fortune (2001)
Absolutely Fabulous (2002)
French & Saunders (2002)
Peep Show (2004–2005)
Green Wing (2004–2007)
Absolute Power (2005)
Feel the Force (2006)
Ruddy Hell! It's Harry and Paul (2008)
Pulling (2006–2009)
Sidney Turtlebaum (2008)
Reggie Perrin (2009)The Persuasionists (2010)Parks and Recreation (2010–2013, 4 episodes)Community (24 episodes)Bored to Death (2010–2011)Happy Endings (2011–2013)Nurse Jackie (2011)Workaholics (2011–2012)Childrens Hospital (2011–2012)New Girl (2012–2013)Big Bad World (2013)
A Merry Friggin' Christmas (2014)
Brooklyn Nine-Nine (2014–2016)
Unbreakable Kimmy Schmidt (2015-2017)
Blunt Talk (2015–2016)
GLOW (2017)
Turn Up Charlie (2019)
Four Weddings and a Funeral (2019)
Never Have I Ever (2020)
Pivoting (2020)
Mr. Mayor (2021)
Acapulco (2021)
Pivoting (2022)

References

External links 

Tristram Shapeero in BBC Comedy Guide
Green Wing "microsite" at Channel4.com

1966 births
British emigrants to the United States
British television directors
Living people
People from Bath, Somerset
People educated at Beechen Cliff School
Date of birth missing (living people)